{
  "type": "ExternalData",
  "service": "geoline",
  "ids": "Q16255640",
  "properties": {
    "stroke": "#1e4d2b",
    "stroke-width": 6
  }
}

The BRT Sunway Line is a bus rapid transit (BRT) line that is part of the Klang Valley Integrated Transit System servicing the southeastern suburbs of Petaling Jaya, Malaysia. It is world's first all-electric Bus Rapid Transit system.

This line is operated by Rapid Bus and was introduced in 2015 to service the high-density areas of Sunway and Subang Jaya, replacing an earlier proposal plan for the now defunct Sunway Monorail extension.

The BRT buses have an exclusive right-of-way on an elevated guideway that is not shared with normal road traffic. This specially-dedicated and grade separated guideway for BRT Sunway Line buses is almost similar to rapid transit elevated railways. However, bus operators other than Rapid Bus, do not have the rights to use it and there is no ramp available from at-grade roads to the elevated guideway.

This closed system is dedicated for a high volume of commuters to avoid congestion.

The BRT system has received  Bronze rating by BRT Standard score from Institute for Transportation and Development Policy (ITDP).

Line information

Halts

Bus Fleet
In February 2014, BYD won the bid to supply 15 new battery-run electric bus for Prasarana Malaysia.
The buses use a lithium ion phosphate battery which is fire-safe and non-toxic, in-wheel hub motors and regenerative braking. There are no caustic materials contained in the battery and no toxic electrolytes or heavy metals and the battery can be completely recycled. The source said that the buses are very quiet and ensures a comfortable ride without vibrations, jerks or noise associated with the conventional buses and combustion engines. The bus can also drive for more than  even in heavy city traffic on a single charge.

Other information

Background
Bus rapid transit (BRT) is a transit system that uses dedicated bus lanes, universal access stations, integrated pedestrian access, rapid boarding and high service frequency. It is a fairly new concept in Malaysia although it has been implemented successfully in cities such as Bogotá, Colombia; Jakarta, Indonesia, and Curitiba, Brazil.

BRT Sunway is a public-private partnership project between Prasarana and Sunway Group to provide a better and integrated transit service for the residents and commuters of Bandar Sunway and USJ. The line costs RM634 million and is 70% funded by Prasarana, 15% by Sunway Bhd and the rest by Unit Kerjasama Awam Swasta (UKAS), a facilitation fund. The system uses eco-friendly electric bus services on elevated tracks  and connects major areas within the areas such as hospital, commercial areas, shopping centres and universities. The system is expected to provide services for 500,000 residents. The elevated bus lane is said to be the first elevated BRT in Southeast Asia

Features
The dedicated elevated busway runs isolated from traffic congestion from the Sunway-Setia Jaya Station, which is located near the KTM Setia Jaya Komuter station (linked by covered pedestrian walkways), and ends at the USJ 7 Station of the Kelana Jaya Line extension, where there is "paid area to paid area" integration between the LRT and BRT service by virtue of the BRT platform sharing the paid area of the concourse of the LRT station.

The bus will complement both line by providing the linkage to various forms of public transports. The electric buses are designed to look almost like trains.

The BRT stations are built with a modern and contemporary design, which include universal access facilities the disabled community such as tactiles for the blind, ramps as well as low ticket counters. Safety features at the stations consist of closed-circuit TV cameras as well as pedestrian bridges so that commuters can cross from one platform to another with ease. SunU-Monash halt has park-and-ride facilities with a total of 1,153 car parking bays, which includes 102 special bays for lady drivers and 23 for the handicapped group, and another 121 bays for motorcycles.

According to Prasarana, the ridership for the entire line is forecasted to be at 2,400 riders per hour for 2015 and is expected to reach 5,200 people every hour in 2035.

Services
The BRT service was officially launched to the public on 2 June 2015. Rides on the BRT are free for the first two months beginning 2 June 2015. A flat rate of RM4.00 will be charged at the SunU-Monash station park and ride facility from 2 June to 1 August 2015. The electric buses will be available every four minutes. The ebus service takes around 30 minutes on full loop journey between BRT halts of Sunway-Setia Jaya to USJ 7 round-trip.

The latest fare has been announced on 1 December 2018 as:

Criticism

Affordability 
Since the new fare was announced in August 2015, the BRT Sunway Line has been heavily criticised by passengers for its steep and unaffordable prices compared with other public transport services operated by Prasarana. For instance, travelling on the BRT Sunway Line from one end to another (USJ7 to / from Setia Jaya) would cost passengers RM5.40 (cashless ticket), traversing  in distance. The National Public Transport Users Association (4PAM) went as far as to call the rates "shocking".

It has been reported that 13,000 people rode the BRT when it was free during its initial months in June and July 2015, but the number of passengers has since drastically number declined to 4,000 when the fare was introduced.

However, Prasarana has repeatedly maintained that its fare is relatively low, given the high maintenance and initial cost involved, in addition to  various cashless payment options available with discounted fares.

Gallery

See also 
List of bus rapid transit systems
 Public transport in Kuala Lumpur
 Buses in Kuala Lumpur
 Prasarana Malaysia Berhad
 Rapid Bus Sdn Bhd
 Rapid KL
 BRT Sunway Line
 BRT Federal Line
 Rapid Penang
 Rapid Kuantan
 Land Public Transport Commission (SPAD)
 Sunway Group

References

External links
 MYrapid website

2015 establishments in Malaysia
Bus rapid transit in Malaysia
Elevated_bus_rapid_transit